Texas's 17th congressional district of the United States House of Representatives includes a strip of Central Texas and Deep East Texas stretching from Nacogdoches to Waco and Round Rock, including former President George W. Bush's McLennan County ranch. The district is currently represented by Republican Pete Sessions.

From 2005 to 2013, it was an oblong district stretching from south of Tarrant County to Grimes County in the southeast. The 2012 redistricting made its area more square, removing the northern and southeastern portions, adding areas southwest into the northern Austin suburbs and east into Freestone and Leon counties. The district included two major universities, Texas A&M University in College Station and Baylor University in Waco.

Before 2005, the district stretched from the Abilene area to the outer western fringes of the Dallas-Fort Worth Metroplex.

Representation
After the 2003 Texas redistricting, engineered by former House Majority Leader Tom DeLay, TX-17 was (along with MS-4) the most heavily Republican district in the nation to be represented by a Democrat, according to the Cook Partisan Voting Index, which rated it R+20. The district was drawn to make it Republican-dominated and unseat its longtime incumbent, conservative Democrat Chet Edwards. While several of his colleagues were defeated by Republicans in 2004, Edwards held on to the seat in the 2004, 2006 and 2008 elections.

But in the 2010 Congressional elections, the district elected Republican Bill Flores over Edwards by a margin of 61.8% to 36.6%. Flores was the first Republican to be elected to represent the district since its creation in 1919. Flores retired after five terms and former Texas 32nd district Congressman Pete Sessions, a Waco native, was elected in 2020.

After passage of civil rights legislation and other changes, through the late 20th and early 21st centuries, white conservatives began to shift into the Republican Party in Texas. They first supported presidential candidates, and gradually more Republicans for local, state and national office, resulting in the 2010 switch in party representation.

List of members representing the district

Election results from presidential races

Election results

Historical district boundaries

See also

List of United States congressional districts

References

Sources

 Congressional Biographical Directory of the United States 1774–present

17